Boronia ruppii, commonly known as Rupp's boronia, is a species of plant in the citrus family Rutaceae and is endemic to a small area in New South Wales. It is a shrub with hairy branches, simple and trifoliate leaves and pink, four-petalled flowers in the leaf axils. It only grows around the abandoned Woodsreef asbestos mine.

Description
The eight stamens alternate in length with those near the sepals slightly longer than those near the petals.

Taxonomy and naming
Rupp's boronia was first formally described in 1928 by Edwin Cheel who published the description in Journal and Proceedings of the Royal Society of New South Wales from a specimen collected by Herman Rupp. The specific epithet (ruppii) honours the collector of the type specimen.

Distribution and habitat
Boronia ruppii grows in dry woodland on soils derived from serpentinite and only occurs around the abandoned Woodsreef asbestos mine near Barraba.

Conservation status
This boronia is listed as "endangered" under the New South Wales Government Biodiversity Conservation Act 2016. The main threats to the species are grazing by domestic livestock, feral and native animals, inappropriate fire regimes, clearing and habitat disturbance, and its small population size.

References 

ruppii
Flora of New South Wales
Plants described in 1928
Taxa named by Edwin Cheel